Puente zuazo

Puente Zuazo is a bridge located in San Fernando in the Province of Cádiz, Andalusia, Spain. The original bridge was built in 1411. This historic bridge has been the scene of important battles in the history of Spain, such as the looting by the British or the surging by Napoleon's troops. It has undergone significant changes over the years.

References

Buildings and structures completed in 1336
Bridges completed in the 14th century
Buildings and structures in San Fernando, Cádiz
Bridges in Andalusia